The Ayrshire (Earl of Carrick's Own) Yeomanry was a Regiment of the British Yeomanry and is now an armoured Squadron of the Scottish and North Irish Yeomanry (SNIY), part of the British Army Reserve. It is the Lowlands of Scotland's only Royal Armoured Corps Unit and has an unbroken history stretching back to the 1790s.

The squadron is part of 51st (Scottish) Brigade within the Army's Support Command. The Scottish and North Irish Yeomanry is the only yeomanry regiment that serves in the reconnaissance role, equipped with the Wolf Land Rover with Weapons Mount Installation Kit (WMIK) and with HMG (heavy machine gun 12.7mm L1A1) and GMPG (General purpose machine gun 7.62mm L7A2). On mobilisation, it provides squadrons to reinforce the regular Light Cavalry regiments. It has provided personnel to both Operation HERRICK in Afghanistan and Operation TELIC in Iraq, who have served with their regular counterparts in the Royal Armoured Corps and other arms and services.

The Ayrshire Yeomanry has won numerous battle honours and one Victoria Cross.

History

Formation and early history
The Ayrshire (Earl of Carrick's Own) Yeomanry was formed as an independent troop of Fencible Cavalry by The Earl of Cassillis sometime around 1794. It was formally adopted into the Army List in 1798 as The Ayrshire Regiment of Yeomanry Cavalry. The Yeomanry were established and recruited at this time to provide Britain with a defence against any invasion by French forces under Napoleon. The regiment spent its formative years as an aid to the civil powers, reacting to and controlling riots across Ayrshire and beyond, most notably in Paisley. In 1897, the regiment was granted permission to use the title Ayrshire Yeomanry Cavalry (Earl of Carrick's Own) in honour of the future King Edward VII, as Earl of Carrick is a subsidiary title of the Princes of Wales deriving from the Ayrshire district of Carrick.

Second Boer War
The Yeomanry was not intended to serve overseas, but due to the string of defeats during Black Week in December 1899, the British government realized they were going to need more troops than just the regular army. A Royal Warrant was issued on 24 December 1899 to allow volunteer forces to serve in the Second Boer War. The Royal Warrant asked standing Yeomanry regiments to provide service companies of approximately 115 men each for the Imperial Yeomanry. With the Lanarkshire Yeomanry, the regiment co-sponsored the 17th (Ayrshire and Lanarkshire) Company for the 6th (Scottish) Battalion in 1900.

On their return in 1901, the regiment was reorganized as mounted infantry and titled the Ayrshire (Earl of Carrick's Own) Imperial Yeomanry. In 1908, it was transferred into the new Territorial Force, returning to the cavalry role as the Ayrshire (Earl of Carrick's Own) Yeomanry. The regiment was based at Wellington Square in Ayr at this time.

First World War

In accordance with the Territorial and Reserve Forces Act 1907 (7 Edw. 7, c.9), which brought the Territorial Force into being, the TF was intended to be a home defence force for service during wartime and members could not be compelled to serve outside the country. However, on the outbreak of war on 4 August 1914, many members volunteered for Imperial Service. Therefore, TF units were split in August and September 1914 into 1st Line (liable for overseas service) and 2nd Line (home service for those unable or unwilling to serve overseas) units. Later, a 3rd Line was formed to act as a reserve, providing trained replacements for the 1st and 2nd Line regiments.

1/1st Ayrshire (Earl of Carrick's Own) Yeomanry

On the outbreak of the First World War, the regiment was one of the fastest to react to the mobilisation order and received congratulations from Scottish Command, even though there was an initial delay in that the orders came in a code that had not been issued to the regiment! Following mobilisation, the regiment joined the Lowland Mounted Brigade and remained in the United Kingdom, on home defence duties, until 1915. The regiment finally deployed overseas in September of that year, where it took part in the Gallipoli landings, serving as dismounted infantry. The regiment was attached to the 52nd (Lowland) Division in October; it was withdrawn in January 1916 and moved to Egypt. In early 1917, the regiment was amalgamated with the Lanarkshire Yeomanry to form the 12th (Ayr and Lanark Yeomanry) Battalion of the Royal Scots Fusiliers in 74th (Yeomanry) Division (The Broken Spurs), seeing service in the Palestine campaign before moving to the Western Front in May 1918. A member of this regiment, Thomas Caldwell, won the Victoria Cross on 31 October 1918 at Oudenaarde in Belgium.

2/1st Ayrshire (Earl of Carrick's Own) Yeomanry
The 2nd line regiment was formed in 1914. In 1915, it was under the command of the 2/1st Lowland Mounted Brigade in Scotland (along with the 2/1st Lanarkshire Yeomanry and the 2/1st Lothians and Border Horse) and by March 1916 was at Dunbar, East Lothian. On 31 March 1916, the remaining Mounted Brigades were numbered in a single sequence and the brigade became 20th Mounted Brigade, still at Dunbar under Scottish Command.

In July 1916, there was a major reorganization of 2nd Line yeomanry units in the United Kingdom. All but 12 regiments were converted to cyclists and as a consequence the regiment was dismounted and the brigade converted to 13th Cyclist Brigade. Further reorganization in October and November 1916 saw the brigade redesignated as 9th Cyclist Brigade in November, still at Dunbar.

About May 1918, the brigade moved to Ireland and the regiment was stationed at Omagh, County Tyrone. There were no further changes before the end of the war.

3/1st Ayrshire (Earl of Carrick's Own) Yeomanry
The 3rd Line regiment was formed in 1915 and in the summer was affiliated to a Reserve Cavalry Regiment at Aldershot. In June 1916, it left the Reserve Cavalry Regiment and went to Perth. The regiment was disbanded in early 1917 with personnel transferring to the 2nd Line regiment or to the 4th (Reserve) Battalion of the Royal Scots Fusiliers at Catterick.

Between the wars
Post war, a commission was set up to consider the shape of the Territorial Force (Territorial Army from 1 October 1921). The experience of the First World War made it clear that cavalry was surfeit. The commission decided that only the 14 most senior regiments were to be retained as cavalry (though the Lovat Scouts and the Scottish Horse were also to remain mounted as "scouts"). Eight regiments were converted to Armoured Car Companies of the Royal Tank Corps (RTC), one was reduced to a battery in another regiment, one was absorbed into a local infantry battalion, one became a signals regiment and two were disbanded. The remaining 25 regiments were converted to brigades of the Royal Field Artillery between 1920 and 1922. As the 7th most senior regiment in the order of precedence, the regiment was retained as horsed cavalry.

Second World War
Between the First and Second World Wars, the regiment returned to its horsed Cavalry training in Scotland. However, when the call to duty came again at the beginning of Second World War, the Ayrshire Yeomanry was faced with a difficult choice, they were not required as a cavalry or as an armoured Regiment and were, instead, asked to fill a gap in the Army's Artillery organisation. In 1940, the regiment transferred into the Royal Artillery and duly formed two Regiments of Field Artillery; 151st (Ayrshire Yeomanry) Field Regiment, RA, formed in February, and 152nd (Ayrshire Yeomanry) Field Regiment, RA, formed in April as a second-line duplicate.

151st (Ayrshire Yeomanry) Field Regiment, RA

The 151st remained in the United Kingdom until 1942, when it was assigned to 46th Infantry Division and fought in the Tunisia Campaign. It was assigned to the 11th Armoured Division in 1944, and remained with it through the campaign in North-Western Europe.

152nd (Ayrshire Yeomanry) Field Regiment, RA

The 152nd was attached to the 6th Armoured Division in mid-1942, and moved with the division to North Africa that November. It remained with the division through the remainder of the war, fighting in the Tunisia Campaign, and the Italian Campaign, ending the war in Austria.

Both Regiments fought with great courage and between them they won four Distinguished Service Orders, twenty one Military Crosses and twenty four Military Medals.

Post war
After the War, the regiment reconstituted in the Territorial Army as a Yeomanry Regiment, under its old title of The Ayrshire (Earl of Carrick's Own) Yeomanry, and transferred into the Royal Armoured Corps. The regiment was made part of 30 (Lowland) Independent Armoured Brigade. During this time, the regiment were issued with a wide variety of equipment, including at one stage flamethrower tanks. The regiment consisted of Sabre Squadrons at Ayr, Dalry and Kilmarnock with Regimental Headquarters and Carrick Troop (HQ Squadron) in Ayr.

In 1961, the Ayrshire Yeomanry paraded at Culzean Castle and were presented with their First Guidon bearing the Honours which had been hard won. The Ayrshire Yeomanry continued as an independent Regiment until 1969 when, in common with most of the Yeomanry Regiments, it was reduced to a Cadre of just a few men. On 1 April 1971, this cadre gave rise to two new units; B Squadron of the 2nd Armoured Car Regiment, later renamed the Queen's Own Yeomanry, at the former Regimental Headquarters in Ayr and 251 Squadron of 154th (Lowland) Transport Regiment in Irvine with no affiliation to the Ayrshire Yeomanry lineage. In 1992, the squadron was transferred to the newly formed Scottish Yeomanry.

In 1999, following the Government's "Strategic Defence Review", the Scottish Yeomanry amalgamated with the Queen's Own Yeomanry. Two of the Scottish Yeomanry's four Squadrons – The Ayrshire Yeomanry in Ayr, and The Fife and Forfar Yeomanry/Scottish Horse in Cupar continued to operate under command of The Queen's Own Yeomanry. On 1 July 2014, the squadron left The Queens Own Yeomanry to form the Scottish and North Irish Yeomanry. Following the latest defence review, the squadron became 'light cavalry' and uses the Land Rover RWMIK.

Organisation
A (Ayrshire (Earl of Carrick's Own) Yeomanry) Squadron is based at Yeomanry House on Chalmers Road in Ayr.

Battle honours
The Ayrshire Yeomanry was awarded the following battle honours (honours in bold are emblazoned on the regimental colours):

Guidon

The guidon of The Ayrshire (Earl of Carrick's Own) Yeomanry was presented by General Sir Horatius Murray KBE CB DSO at Culzean Castle, Ayrshire on 24 June 1961. The battle honours of the regiment emblazoned on both sides of the Guidon are as follows:

Placed under the central tie of the Union wreath is the Honorary Distinction: the badge of the Royal Regiment of Artillery within a laurel wreath bearing four scrolls inscribed as follows:

Victoria Cross
The only member of the regiment to be awarded the Victoria Cross was Thomas Caldwell for his actions on 31 October 1918 at Oudenaarde in Belgium.

Uniform
Prior to 1893, the Ayrshire Yeomanry wore black-leather helmets and black plumes with a dark blue uniform and scarlet facings. This was replaced by a hussar style uniform, including a fur busby with white plume and scarlet bag. Officers' tunics included a unique "figure-of-eight" front gold braiding, while other-ranks wore hip-length stable jackets of dark blue with scarlet collars and cuffs. This elaborate uniform was discarded after the Boer War and at the 1911 Coronation the Ayrshire Yeomanry was one of only two mounted regiments participating to wear plain khaki. The former facing-colours were commemorated by scarlet piping on the breeches.

Regimental music

The Ayrshire Yeomanry song, The Proud Trooper, was written as a poem following the regiment's actions in South Africa and the first verse is now often sung, to the tune of Amazing Grace, when several Ayrshire Yeomen are together. The lyrics of the first verse of The Proud Trooper are as follows:

"I’ve Listed in The County Horse,
A Yeoman don’t you know,
With spurs of steel upon my heel,
full swagger now I go,
I’ve sworn an oath to serve the Queen,
And to defend Her Throne,
I’m proud to be a Trooper in,
The Earl of Carrick’s Own."

The Ayrshire Yeomanry Locomotive

Of the 842 LMS Stanier Class 5 4-6-0 Locomotives, commonly known as "Black Fives", only four were named, and those were in honour of Scottish Regiments: Lanarkshire Yeomanry, The Queens Edinburgh, Ayrshire Yeomanry, Glasgow Highlander and Glasgow Yeomanry.

Alliances
  – The Royal Scots Dragoon Guards (Carabiniers and Greys)

See also

 Imperial Yeomanry
 List of Yeomanry Regiments 1908
 Yeomanry
 Yeomanry order of precedence
 British yeomanry during the First World War
 Second line yeomanry regiments of the British Army
 List of British Army Yeomanry Regiments converted to Royal Artillery

Notes

References

Bibliography

External links

 

 Scottish and North Irish Yeomanry - Official Website

 
Yeomanry regiments of the British Army
Yeomanry regiments of the British Army in World War I
Scottish regiments
Military units and formations in Ayrshire
Military of Scotland
Military units and formations established in 1794
Military units and formations established in 1798
Military units and formations established in 1971
Ayr
Ayrshire
Regiments of the British Army in World War II
1794 establishments in Great Britain